The 2010 Trofeo Linea Brasil season is the first Trofeo Linea Brasil season. It began on 30 May at  Autódromo Internacional Nelson Piquet and will end on December 5 at Autódromo Internacional de Santa Cruz do Sul after six rounds.

The category part of Racing Festival, championship idealized by the Formula One driver Felipe Massa and his family.

After losing the title of Stock Car Brasil by a one point, Cacá Bueno won the debut season of the Trofeo Linea Brasil.

Bueno was the only driver to win more than a victory taking three wins, nine drivers won a victory, Popó Bueno and Ulisses Silva in Jacarepaguá, Cesinha Bonilha and Serafin Jr. in Londrina, Duda Pamplona at Interlagos, Giuliano Losacco and Clemente de Faria, Jr. in Pinhais, Christian Fittipaldi at Brasília and runner-up André Bragantini at Santa Cruz do Sul.

Teams and drivers
All cars are powered by FPT engines and use Fiat Linea chassis.

Race calendar and results

Championship standings
Points were awarded as follows:

References

External links
 Official website of the Trofeo Linea Brasil

Trofeo Linea Brasil
Copa Fiat Brasil